SNZ may refer to:

Organizations
Scouts New Zealand, the Scout Association of New Zealand
SeaLink New Zealand, a group of companies including Captain Cook Cruises and Kangaroo Island SeaLink
Squash New Zealand, the governing body of squash in New Zealand
Swimming New Zealand, the governing body of swimming in New Zealand
Statistics New Zealand, the department that collects statistics related to the economy, population and society of New Zealand
Squirrel Nut Zippers, American retro swing band during 1990s

People 
Sergei Nikolayevich Zhukov (born 1967), Russian professional football coach and former player
Sultanah Nur Zahirah (born 1973), HRH Sultanah Nur Zahirah, The Sultanah
Stephen N. Zack (born 1947), President of American Bar Association 2010–2011

Ethnic groups
Samoan New Zealanders, Samoan immigrants in New Zealand
Serbian New Zealanders, NZ citizens of Serbian descent or Serbia-born people who reside in New Zealand
Spanish New Zealanders, NZ citizens and residents of Spanish descent, or people who were born in Spain and emigrated to New Zealand

Entertainment
SNZ (group), Brazilian pop music group
Squirrel Nut Zippers, American swing and jazz band

Other uses
 Saudi-Iraq Neutral Zone
 Stadium New Zealand, national stadium proposed for Auckland's waterfront to host the 2011 Rugby World Cup